Javanabad (also Romanized as Javānābād; also known as Delbar-e Rok Rok) is a village in Veysian Rural District, Veysian District, Dowreh County, Lorestan Province, Iran. At the 2006 census, its population was 255, in 61 families.

References 

Towns and villages in Dowreh County